Shannon Stephen is a Singaporean professional football player who previously played for the Singapore Premier League side, Tampines Rovers as a defender.

National career

After tearing his anterior cruciate ligament twice in 2013 and 2015, Stephen rebounded and returned to the field, catching the attention of Singapore coach V Sundramoorthy. Stephen was called up to the National Team in 2016.

Career statistics

Club

References

Living people
1994 births
Malaysian footballers
Singapore Premier League players
Geylang International FC players
Balestier Khalsa FC players
Association football defenders